Kazhugu 2 is a 2019 Indian Tamil-language comedy thriller film written and directed by Sathyasiva, starring Krishna and Bindu Madhavi. It is the sequel to the 2012 film, Kazhugu. It was produced by Singaravelan under the banner Madhukkoor films. The music was composed by Yuvan Shankar Raja. The film was released on 1 August 2019 to below average reviews. The Hindi dubbed version was telecast on Dhinchaak TV channel As A Shatir Chor on 22 June 2020.

Plot 
The story revolves around two petty thieves Johnny (Krishna) and his accomplice Kaali (Kaali Venkat), as they are mistaken for huntsmen who can protect the laborers who are working in a deadly forest that is habituated by Dhole. The crooks use this opportunity as a hideout and what happens next forms the rest of the film.

Cast

Production 
In 2018, Thirupur P. A. Ganesan announced that he would produce a film directed by Sathyasiva starring Krishna in the lead role. Kazhugu 2 shooting begins 3 July.

Soundtrack 

This film's all songs are composed by Yuvan Shankar Raja, who had previously composed for Sathyasiva's previous venture Kazhugu. Yashika Aannand landed a role of a dancer for a song titled Sakalakala Valli which also featured 300 dancers apart from her. The first single of Kazhugu 2 featuring Yashika in folk song was released on 12 January 2019.

References

External links

2019 films
2010s Tamil-language films
Indian sequel films
Indian comedy thriller films
2010s comedy thriller films
Films scored by Yuvan Shankar Raja
Films directed by Sathyasiva
2019 comedy films